Manolete is the nickname of Manuel Laureano Rodríguez Sánchez, a famous Spanish bullfighter

Manolete may also refer to:

Manolete (film) 2007 movie with Adrien Brody and Penélope Cruz set in the 1940s
"Manolete", song by Yawning Man

See also
A Toast for Manolete, a 1948 Spanish drama film